Michael Carpenter may refer to:
Michael E. Carpenter (born 1947), former Maine Attorney General
Michael Carpenter (tennis) (born 1936), Canadian tennis player
Michael Carpenter (politician), 19th-century mayor of Lancaster, Pennsylvania
Michael R. Carpenter, American diplomat
Michael Carpenter, fictional character in The Dresden Files
Michael Carpenter, protagonist of the novel In Limbo